Group A is one of two groups of the 2023 IIHF World Championship. The four best placed teams advance to the playoff round, while the last placed team will be relegated to Division I in 2024.

Standings

Matches
All times are local (UTC+3).

Finland vs United States

Sweden vs Germany

France vs Austria

Hungary vs Denmark

Germany vs Finland

United States vs Hungary

France vs Denmark

Sweden vs Austria

Germany vs United States

Finland vs Sweden

Denmark vs Austria

France vs Hungary

United States vs Austria

Finland vs France

Hungary vs Sweden

Denmark vs Germany

Hungary vs Finland

Austria vs Germany

United States vs Denmark

Austria vs Finland

Sweden vs France

Germany vs Hungary

United States vs France

Denmark vs Sweden

Austria vs Hungary

Germany vs France

Sweden vs United States

Finland vs Denmark

References

External links
Official website

A